Romance at Short Notice is the second and last album by Dirty Pretty Things, released in the UK on 30 June 2008. The first single, "Tired of England", was released on 23 June 2008. The title of the album is a reference to the final line of the Saki short story "The Open Window".

The second track from the album, "Hippy's Son", was made available free to download on the band's official website for a short time. On 22 June 2008 the band made the entire album available free for streaming at NME.com.

The album entered the UK chart at a 35 and spent 1 week inside the top 40. 
The poor performance is considered to be one of the causes of the band's split-up.

Track listing

 "Buzzards & Crows"
 "Hippy's Son"
 "Plastic Hearts"
 "Tired of England"
 "Come Closer"
 "Faultlines"
 "Kicks or Consumption"
 "Best Face"
 "Truth Begins"
 "Chinese Dogs"
 "The North"
 "Blood on My Shoes"

Chart performance

References

External links

Dirty Pretty Things (band) albums
2008 albums
Vertigo Records albums